The 2018 United States House of Representatives elections in Hawaii were held on Tuesday, November 6, 2018, to elect the two U.S. representatives from the U.S. state of Hawaii; one from each of the state's two congressional districts. Primaries were held on August 11, 2018. The elections and primaries coincided with the elections and primaries of other federal and state offices.

With the 2018 election results, the Democratic Party easily retained both House seats and retained unitary control over the entirety of Hawaii's Congressional (both House and Senate) delegation.

Overview
Results of the 2018 United States House of Representatives elections in Hawaii by district:

District 1

The incumbent is Democrat Colleen Hanabusa, who has represented the district since 2017 and from 2011 to 2015. Hanabusa was elected with 68% of the vote in 2016. She ran for the 2018 Democratic nomination for Governor of Hawaii, and is retiring.

Democratic primary
 Ed Case, former U.S. Representative
 Doug Chin, Lieutenant Governor of Hawaii
 Beth Fukumoto, state representative, former Republican Minority Leader
 Kaniela Ing, state representative
 Donna Mercado Kim, state senator
 Ernie Martin, Honolulu City Councilman
 Sam Puletasi, former federal agent

Endorsements

Polling
{| class=wikitable
|- valign= bottom
! Poll source
! Date(s)administered
! Samplesize
! Margin oferror
! style="width:75px;"|EdCase
! style="width:75px;"|DougChin
! style="width:75px;"|BethFukumoto
! style="width:75px;"|KanielaIng
! style="width:75px;"|ErnieMartin
! style="width:75px;"|Donna MercadoKim
! style="width:75px;"|Undecided
|-
| Merriman River Group
| align=center| July 19–21, 2018
| align=center| 403
| align=center| ± 4.9%
|  align=center| 34%
| align=center| 19%
| align=center| 5%
| align=center| 6%
| align=center| 3%
| align=center| 15%
| align=center| 18%
|-
| Mason-Dixon
| align=center| July 6–11, 2018
| align=center| 244
| align=center| ± 6.4%
|  align=center| 36%
| align=center| 27%
| align=center| 1%
| align=center| 6%
| align=center| 2%
| align=center| 14%
| align=center| 14%
|-
| Merriman River Group
| align=center| May 3–5, 2018
| align=center| 321
| align=center| ± 5.5%
| align=center| –
| align=center| 19%
| align=center| 11%
| align=center| 8%
| align=center| 4%
|  align=center| 26%
|  align=center| 32%

Primary results

Republican primary
Campbell Cavasso, former state representative, and 2004, 2010, and 2014 Republican nominee for U.S. Senate
Raymond Vinole, small business owner

Primary results

Green primary

Primary results

Libertarian primary

Primary results

Nonpartisan primary

Primary results

General election

Results

District 2

The incumbent is Democrat Tulsi Gabbard, who has represented the district since 2013. She was re-elected with 76% of the vote in 2016.

Democratic primary
 Tulsi Gabbard, incumbent
 Sherry Campagna
 Anthony Tony Austin

Polling
{| class=wikitable
|- valign= bottom
! Poll source
! Date(s)administered
! Samplesize
! Margin oferror
! style="width:75px;"|SherryCampagna
! style="width:75px;"|TulsiGabbard
! style="width:75px;"|Undecided
|-
| Merriman River Group
| align=center| July 19–21, 2018
| align=center| 468
| align=center| ± 4.5%
| align=center| 16%
|  align=center| 69%
| align=center| 15%

Primary results

Republican primary
 Brian Evans, singer, Democratic candidate for senator in 2004 and 2014

Primary results

General election

Results

References

External links
Candidates at Vote Smart
Candidates at Ballotpedia
Campaign finance at FEC
Campaign finance at OpenSecrets

Official campaign websites for first district candidates
Ed Case (D) for Congress
Cam Cavasso (R) for Congress

Official campaign websites for second district candidates
Brian Evans (R) for Congress
Tulsi Gabbard (D) for Congress

State of Hawaii Office of Elections
Election Results Homepage
Elected Officials

Hawaii
2018
United States House of Representatives